Kumkuma  is a powder used for social and religious markings in India. It is made from turmeric or any other local materials. The turmeric is dried and powdered with a bit of slaked lime, which turns the rich yellow powder into a red color.

In India, it is known by many names including kuṅkumam (Sanskrit कुङ्कुमम्, Tamil குங்குமம், and Malayalam കുങ്കുമം), kumkuma (Telugu కుంకుమ), kukum (Konkani कुकूम्), kunku (Marathi कुंकू and Gujarati કંકુ), kumkum (Bengali কুমকুম and Hindi कुमकुम), and kunkuma (Kannada ಕುಂಕುಮ).

Application 

Kumkuma is most often applied by Indians to the forehead. The reason involves the ancient Indian belief that "the human body is divided into seven vortices of energy, called chakras, beginning at the base of the spine and ending at the top of the head. The sixth chakra, also known as the third eye, is centered in the forehead directly between the eyebrows and is believed to be the channel through which humankind opens spiritually to the Divine".

Thus, the kumkuma is placed where Indians believe to be the most important spot for receptivity to be enhanced.

Common forehead marks 
Shaivites: Followers of Shiva usually apply three white horizontal lines (made from vibhuti) with a dot of kumkuma at the center. This is also known as tripundra. 
Vaishnavas: Followers of Vishnu make use of "white clay to apply two vertical lines joined at the base and intersected by a bright red streak." Many times the clay is applied in a U-shape. This is known as Vaishnava Tilaka.
Shaktas: Shaktas of most Sampradayas usually apply a dot of vermillion in the center of the forehead with turmeric smeared around it.
Swaminarayana: Followers of the Swaminarayan faith apply kumkuma at the center of the forehead and between a U-shaped tilaka. The tilaka is normally yellow and made from sandalwood.
Chandrakor: Many Maharashtrians – men, women, and children alike – wear it traditionally in the shape of crescent moon.

Significance 
In the Vaishnava tradition, the "white lines represent the footprint of their God, while the red refers to his consort, Lakshmi". The Swaminarayana tradition holds that the tilaka (yellow U-shaped mark) "is a symbol of the lotus feet of Paramatma," and the kumkuma "represents the bhakta" (devotee). In both of these traditions, the forehead mark serves as a reminder that a devotee of God should always remain protected at the feet of God.

The 'color' of the womb is yellow and is symbolically represented by turmeric. The blood stains on the womb is represented by kumkuma. It is believed that the combination of turmeric and kumkuma represents prosperity.

Kumkuma and women 
When a girl or a married woman visits a house, it is a sign of respect (in case of an elderly lady) or blessings (in case of a girl) to offer kumkuma to them when they leave. However, it is not offered to widows.

Men, women, girls, and boys also apply a dot on their forehead of red turmeric powder, when visiting a temple or during a pooja. Kumkuma at temples is found in heaps. People dip their thumb into the heap and apply it on the forehead or between the eyebrows.

In most of India, married women apply red kumkuma to the parting of their hair above their forehead every day as a symbol of marriage. This is called vermilion, or in Hindi, sindoor.  In southern India, many unmarried girls wear a bindi every day unlike northern India where it is only worn as a symbol of marriage.

Making kumkuma 
Kumkum is made from turmeric by adding slaked lime.

Other uses 

Kumkuma is also widely used for worshiping the Hindu goddesses, especially Shakti and Lakshmi, and kumkuma powder is thrown (along with other mixtures) into the air during Holi (the Festival of Colours), a popular Hindu spring festival.

Sanatan Sanstha has published an article which mentions that Kumkuma also is believed to prevent one from "negative energies entering the body".

See also 
Haldi Kumkum
Bindi (decoration)
Tilaka
List of materials used in Hinduism
:Category:Hindu iconography

References

External links 

 Kumkum 2008
 Lead in Spices, Herbal Remedies, and Ceremonial Powders Sampled from Home Investigations for Children with Elevated Blood Lead Levels — North Carolina, 2011–2018

Cosmetics
Hairdressing
Marriage in India
Marriage in Hinduism
Powders